Pajamas, or PJs

Arts and entertainment
 P.J. (film), a 1968 film starring George Peppard
 P.J. (Disney), Pete Junior, a Disney cartoon character
 P.J. (comics), a character in The Family Circus comic strip
 PJ (singer), Paris Alexandria Jones is a singer and songwriter from Greensboro, North Carolina

Businesses
 PJ Media, originally known as Pajamas Media
 PJ Trailers, an American trailer manufacturer
 Peach John, a Japanese lingerie retailer with "pj" logo

Organisations
 PJ, Justicialist Party, (Partido Justicialista), a major Argentine political party
 PJ, Polícia Judiciária, Portuguese criminal investigation police
 PJ, Police Judiciaire, a higher branch of the French police services
 PJ,

Places
 Petaling Jaya, a Malaysian city
 Massie Wireless Station, Rhode Island, U.S.

Other uses
 PJ,  Petajoule, a unit of energy
 pJ, Picojoule, a unit of energy
 PJ, code for United States Air Force Pararescue
 PJ, Personal jurisdiction, a court's jurisdiction over the parties to a lawsuit
 Air Saint-Pierre, (IATA code PJ)
 The PJ, The Pharmaceutical Journal

See also
 PJS (disambiguation)
JP (disambiguation)